Solidarity is a registered political party in Iceland, that was founded 15 January 2012. The leader of the party is Lilja Mósesdóttir. After Lilja Mósesdóttir left the Left-Green Movement in autumn 2011, she became one of the leading founders of the Solidarity party, and worked as the only Solidarity member of parliament for the remaining part of the term until 28 March 2013.

The party decided in February 2013, not to participate in the 2013 Icelandic parliamentary election, but informed they still intended to engage and impact the ongoing political debate in Iceland as much as possible, and thus would continue to be officially registered as a political party with list letter C.

External links
 Official website (in Icelandic)

References

Defunct political parties in Iceland
Political parties established in 2012
2012 establishments in Iceland